Air Vice Marshal Cresswell Montagu Clementi  (30 December 1918 – 26 August 1981) was a senior Royal Air Force (RAF) commander.

Background
Clementi was the son of Cecil Clementi and Marie Penelope Rose Eyres. He was born on 20 December 1918 in British Guiana during his father's posting there as Colonial Secretary (1913–1922). He joined the Royal Air Force Volunteer Reserve in 1939, and was granted a permanent commission in the RAF in 1946. He attended the British nuclear tests in 1958 at Christmas Island. He retired in 1974. He was Master of the Mercers' Company in 1977.

He was on the governing body of Abingdon School from 1979 to 1981.

Family
Clementi married Susan Pelham (1918–2006) in 1940 and had three children:

 Christopher Pelham Clementi (1943–)
 Nancy Clementi (1946–) – married Peter Lambert Tribe in 1972
 Sir David Clementi (1949–) – British banker and recently stepped down as chairman of Prudential plc.

References 

1918 births
1981 deaths
Alumni of Magdalen College, Oxford
British people of Italian descent
Commanders of the Order of the British Empire
Companions of the Order of the Bath
Royal Air Force air marshals
Royal Air Force Volunteer Reserve personnel of World War II
Governors of Abingdon School
British expatriates in Guyana